State Route 39 (SR 39) is a  state highway in the western part of the U.S. state of Alabama. The southern terminus of the highway is at its intersection with U.S. Route 11 (US 11) near Livingston. The northern terminus of the highway is at its intersection with SR 14 at Clinton, an unincorporated community in western Greene County.

Route description

SR 39 is a rural, two-lane highway that serves as a connecting route between Livingston and western Greene County. From its southern terminus at US 11, the highway travels in a northerly direction. At Gainesville, it intersects, and serves as the eastern terminus of, SR 116. From Gainesville, the highway turns to the northeast, continuing this trajectory until it intersects SR 14 at Clinton.

Major intersections

See also

References

039
Transportation in Sumter County, Alabama
Transportation in Greene County, Alabama